The KDS Micronex is a patented grinder-dryer which grinds and dries materials in a single-step process without needing any heat input. It is manufactured and sold by First American Scientific Corp. of Abbotsford, British Columbia.

The KDS (Kinetic Disintegration System) was originally developed by Spectrasonic Disintegration Equipment Corp.  and was licensed to First American Scientific Corp. from 1995 until 1999.  First American Scientific Corp. purchased ownership of the KDS technology in 1999 and has since been awarded three American patents protecting its applications.  The North American patents protecting the KDS technology are:

Device and method for comminution - US Patent # 6,024,307 and Canadian Patent # 2,218,429
Cryogenic comminution of rubber - US Patent # 6,655,167
Method of recovery of precious metal & heavy minerals - US Patent # 6,682,005
Recovery of fuel and clay from a biomass  -  US Patent # 7,481,385

Grinding and drying characteristics

The KDS Micronex grinds materials that are fed onto spinning chains or bars located in a grinding chamber. Tip speeds of 200 m/s create high velocity airflows (4000 cfm) and produce high velocity impacts when striking the materials being processed.  A simultaneous drying event occurs because:

-the repeated striking of the materials against the chains, baffle plates contained inside the grinding chamber, and against themselves create kinetic energy which heats the material

-the high velocity impacts force moisture out of the material, and reduce particle size (increasing exposure to evaporating airflow)

-the airflows created help to evaporate surface moisture and its airflows keep the particles suspended in air (allowing for air to flow over the complete surface area of the material)

Once the materials reach a pre-determined size they will pass through an internal classifier.  The classifier in the unit controls the particle size within the range between 30-325 Mesh (scale).

Government-funded research and development

The KDS Micronex has been the subject of funding from municipal, state and federal levels of government, with funding coming from:

United States Department of Energy to determine the optimum design parameters for the machine and predict its performance

Sustainable Development Technology Canada to demonstrate the ability of the KDS to de-water waste from the pulp and paper industry for use as hog fuel as well as its ability to recycle its components

United States Department of Agriculture to research "Integrated Size Reduction and Separation to Pre-Fractionate Biomass"

Waste & Resources Action Programme (UK) to derive economic opportunities from paper mill sludge through its recycling into usable materials

City of Prince George, B.C. to test the ability of the KDS Micronex to depathogenize biosolids for its use as a class “A” fertilizer

Minnesota Department of Agriculture NextGen Energy Board (in addition to funding from Xcel Energy, Inc.) to research the ability of the KDS Micronex to dry various biomass feedstocks for pellet fuel production.

References

Biomass
Comminution